Boloria is a brush-footed butterfly (Nymphalidae) genus. Clossiana is usually included with it nowadays, though some authors still consider it distinct and it seems to warrant recognition as a subgenus at least.

Species
Listed alphabetically:
 Boloria acrocnema Gall & Sperling, 1980 – Uncompahgre fritillary
 Boloria alaskensis (Holland, 1900) – mountain fritillary (Arctic America, Alaska to Hudson Bay, Wyoming, Polar Urals, Yamal Peninsula, Transbaikalia, Chukotka, Wrangel Island)
 Boloria aquilonaris (Stichel, 1908) – cranberry fritillary
 Boloria alberta (W.H. Edwards, 1890) – Alberta fritillary
 Boloria angarensis (Erschoff, 1870) (Transbaikalia, South Siberia, Far East Yakutia, Polar Urals, Yamal Peninsula, Sayan, Tuva mountains, Amur, Ussuri, North Korea, Northeast China)
 Boloria astarte (Doubleday, [1847]) – Astarte fritillary
 Boloria bellona (Fabricius, 1775) – meadow fritillary
 Boloria caucasica (Lederer, 1852) (Caucasus, Transcaucasia, Turkey)
 Boloria chariclea (Schneider, 1794) – Arctic fritillary or purplish fritillary
 Boloria dia (Linnaeus, 1767) – Weaver's fritillary or violet fritillary
 Boloria distincta (Gibson, 1920) (Yukon to British Columbia, Polar Urals, Transbaikalia, Yakutia, Chukotka)
 Boloria elatus (Staudinger, 1892) (Transbaikalia)
 Boloria epithore (Edwards, [1864]) – Pacific fritillary
 Boloria erda (Christoph, 1893) (Yakutia, Sayan, Transbaikalia, Magadan)
 Boloria erubescens (Staudinger, 1901) (Tian-Shan, Ghissar-Darvaz, Pamirs-Alai)
 Boloria eunomia (Esper, [1800]) – bog fritillary, ocellate bog fritillary
 Boloria euphrosyne (Linnaeus, 1758) – pearl-bordered fritillary
 Boloria freija (Thunberg, 1791) – Freya's fritillary, Freija fritillary or zigzag fritillary
 Boloria frigga (Thunberg, 1791) – Frigga fritillary, willow bog fritillary
 Boloria frigidalis Warren, 1944 (Altai, Sayan, Tuva mountains, Mongolia)
 Boloria improba (Butler, 1877) – dingy fritillary
 Boloria iphigenia (Graeser, 1888) (Japan, east Amur, Ussuri and northeast China)
 Boloria gong (Oberthür, 1884) (Tibet, West China, North China)
 Boloria graeca (Staudinger, 1870) – Balkan fritillary
 Boloria jerdoni (Lang, 1868) – Jerdon's silverspot
 Boloria kriemhild (Butler, 1877) – relict fritillary (Montana, Wyoming)
 Boloria matveevi Gorbunov & Korshunov, 1995  (Altai)
 Boloria napaea (Hoffmannsegg, 1804) – napaea fritillary or mountain fritillary
 Boloria natazhati (Gibson, 1920) – cryptic fritillary or Beringian fritillary
 Boloria neopales (Nakahara, 1926) (Sakhalin)
 Boloria oscarus (Eversmann, 1844) (Siberia, Amur, Ussuri, Sakhalin, Yakutia)
 Boloria pales (Denis & Schiffermüller, 1775) – Shepherd's fritillary
 Boloria perryi (Butler, 1882)  (southern Ussuri, North Korea, Amur)
 Boloria polaris (Boisduval, [1828]) – Polaris fritillary
 Boloria purpurea Churkin, 1999 (Barguzin Mountains in Buryatia)
 Boloria selene (Denis & Schiffermüller, 1775) – small pearl-bordered fritillary or silver-bordered fritillary
 Boloria selenis (Eversmann, 1837)
 Boloria sipora (Moore, [1875]) (Pamirs to Alai, Tian-Shan, West Himalaya)
 Boloria thore (Hübner, [1803]) – Thor's fritillary
 Boloria titania (Esper, 1793) – Titania's fritillary or purple bog fritillary
 Boloria tritonia (Böber, 1812) (Baikal, Amur, Ussuri)

Brachiopod
Grunt described a brachiopod genus in 1973 under the same name. Since each code of biological nomenclature allows only for one genus with the same name, the brachiopod genus is in need of renaming.

References

Further reading 
 Glassberg, Jeffrey (2001). Butterflies through Binoculars: The West.
 Guppy, Crispin S. and Shepard, Jon H. (2001). Butterflies of British Columbia.
 James, David G. and Nunnallee, David (2011). Life Histories of Cascadia Butterflies.
 Pelham, Jonathan (2008). Catalogue of the Butterflies of the United States and Canada.
 Pyle, Robert Michael (2002). The Butterflies of Cascadia.

External links 
 Butterflies and Moths of North America
 Butterflies of America
 images representing Boloria at Consortium for the Barcode of Life
 images representing Boloria at Encyclopedia of Life

 
Nymphalidae genera
Taxa named by Frederic Moore
Taxonomy articles created by Polbot
Argynnini